Good for Me may refer to:

 Good for Me (album), by The Swellers
 "Good for Me" (song), a 1992 song by Amy Grant
 "Good for Me", a song by Kirsty MacColl on the album Tropical Brainstorm
 "Good for Me", a song by Above & Beyond on the album Tri-State
 "Good for Me", a song by Medicine on the album The Mechanical Forces of Love
 "Good for Me", a song by Bob Seger & The Silver Bullet Band from the album Against the Wind
 "Good for Me", a song by Richie Kotzen from the album Change
 "Good for Me", a song by Trin-i-tee 5:7 from the album 7

See also
 Good For You (disambiguation)